Daniel Kamwa (born 14 April 1943) is a filmmaker and actor from Nkongsamba, Cameroon. He studied drama in Paris, France, before producing his first film, Boubou-cravate, in 1973. His 1981 film Our Daughter was entered into the 12th Moscow International Film Festival.

Filmography as director
Boubou-cravate, director (1973)
Pousse-Pousse, director (1976)
Notre Fille, director (1980)
Vidéolire, director (1991)
Totor, actor and director (1994)
Le Cercle des pouvoirs, director (1998)

References

External links

Living people
1943 births
Cameroonian male actors
Cameroonian film directors
People from Nkongsamba